Burglar Proof is a 1920 American silent comedy film directed by Maurice Campbell and written by Thomas J. Geraghty. The film stars Bryant Washburn, Lois Wilson, Grace Morse, Emily Chichester, Clarence Geldart, and Clarence Burton. The film was released on November 21, 1920, by Paramount Pictures. It is not known whether the film currently survives.

Cast
Bryant Washburn as John Harlow
Lois Wilson as Laura Lowell
Grace Morse as Jenny Larkin
Emily Chichester as Clara
Clarence Geldart as Richard Crane
Clarence Burton as Martin Green
Tom Bates as Uncle Jim Harlow 
Hayward Mack as George
Blanche Gray as Mrs. Lowell

References

External links

Still at alamy.com

1920 films
1920s English-language films
Silent American comedy films
1920 comedy films
Paramount Pictures films
American black-and-white films
American silent feature films
Films directed by Maurice Campbell
1920s American films